Kingston College is a public school in Kingston, a suburb of Logan City, Queensland, Australia.  It incorporates a centre for continuing secondary education.

History
The Minister for Education, V. J. Bird (MLA), opened Kingston State High School in 1977. Its students come mainly from the residential suburbs of Kingston, Marsden, Browns Plains, Loganlea, and Woodridge.
Kingston College has been formally renamed Kingston State College from January 2016.

Location and facilities
Kingston State College is within the Logan district and occupies the southern portion of Kingston Hill. The campus features a natural woodland environment. It contains ample playing fields and courts, and a swimming pool.

Offerings
The school provides a range of extra-curricular activities. An Instrumental Music program and school band has been in operation for several years, as well as a Student Athlete Academy. The school takes part in a variety of sporting activities, cultural performances and academic competitions and has enjoyed a number of successes at regional and state levels of competition. Kingston State College also participates in a number of science related programs such as Opti-Minds and the Australian Brain Bee Competition. Kingston State College strives for performance in the areas of science, performing arts and business.

References

Educational institutions established in 1977
Public high schools in Queensland
Schools in Logan City
1977 establishments in Australia
Kingston, Queensland